Esendere is a belde in Yüksekova District in Hakkâri Province in Turkey. The belde is populated by Kurds of the Dirî and Geravî tribes and had a population of 2,786 in 2022.

The State road D.400 runs through Esendere before it ends at the border with Iran.

It comprises the neighborhoods of Güvenli, Merkez, Sarıyıldız and Yılmaz.

Population 
Population history of the municipality from 2000 to 2022:

References 

Populated places in Hakkâri Province
Kurdish settlements in Hakkâri Province
Iran–Turkey border crossings